Gordon Thomas (21 February 1933 – 3 March 2017) was a British investigative journalist and author, notably on topics of secret intelligence.  Thomas was the author of 53 books published worldwide including The Pope's Jews, Secret Wars, and Gideon's Spies, with sales exceeding 45 million copies. Thomas got the scoop on the nationalisation of the Suez Canal for the Daily Express in 1956. He was a cousin of the poet Dylan Thomas.

Biography
Thomas was born in Wales, in a cemetery keeper's cottage where his grandmother lived. He had his first story published at nine years old in a Boy's Own Paper competition. With his father in the RAF, he travelled widely and was educated at the Cairo High School, the Marist Brothers (in Port Elizabeth, South Africa) and, lastly, at Bedford Modern School. His first book, completed at the age of seventeen, is the story of a British spy in Russia during the Second World War, titled Descent Into Danger. He refused the offer of a job at a university in order to accompany a travelling fair for a year: he used those experiences for his novel, Bed of Nails. Since then his books have been published worldwide. He has been a foreign correspondent beginning with the Suez Crisis and ending with the first Gulf War. He was a BBC writer/producer for three flagship BBC programmes: Man Alive, Tomorrow's World and Horizon.

He was a regular contributor to the Japanese news magazine Facta and he lectured widely on the secret world of intelligence. He also provided expert analysis on intelligence for US and European television and radio programmes.

In 1998 he wrote and narrated a major documentary for Channel 4: The Spy Machine. It followed three years of research during which he was given access to Mossad's main personnel. The documentary was co-produced by Open Media and Israfilm. Two years later Thomas wrote Gideon's Spies: Mossad's Secret Warriors. As Thomas's "Notes on Sources" afterword to Gideon's Spies makes clear, the research for the film provided him with some, but not all, of the sources and material he used when writing his later book independently of Channel 4 and the film-makers. Gideon's Spies has so far been published in 16 languages. Sources for the book included Ari Ben-Menashe, a former Israeli intelligence agent, and Israeli spy Rafi Eitan. According to Charles Foster in Contemporary Review: "Writers who know their place are few and far between: fortunately Mr Thomas is one of them. By keeping to his place as a tremendous storyteller without a preacher's pretensions, he has put his book amongst the important chronicles of the state of Israel."

His 1974 book Voyage of the Damned was adapted for the 1976 film starring Faye Dunaway which won five Academy Award nominations. In 2020, playwright Tom Stoppard adapted for BBC Radio 4 Daniel Kehlmann's play based on the same book.

His last book was Shadow Warriors: Daring Missions of World War II by Women of the OSS and SOE (written with Greg Lewis]).

He died on 3 March 2017 at the age of 84 at the Royal United Hospital, Bath, Somerset, England.

Personal life
Thomas was a cousin of the poet Dylan Thomas who helped him publish his first book. He divided his time between his homes in Ireland and England, with his wife, an interior designer. His five children work in various parts of the entertainment industry.

Major awards
International Television Award from the Festival de Télévision de Monte-Carlo
Two Mark Twain Society Awards for Reporting Excellence
Edgar Allan Poe Award for Shipwreck

Selected bibliography
 
 
 
 
 Thomas, G. (1987). The Jesus Conspiracy: An Investigative Reporter's Look at an Extraordinary Life and Death.

Book clubs
Thomas's works have appeared in:
 The Book of the Month Club
 The Literary Guild Book
 The Reader's Digest Book Club

Film adaptations
 Voyage of the Damned won five Academy Award nominations
 Enola Gay won the Emmy Awards Foreign Critics Prize
 Experiences won the Juries and Critics prize at the Monte-Carlo Film Festival

See also
William Francis Buckley
Robert Maxwell, on whose life Thomas was an authoritative writer
The Spy Machine

References

External links
 My Story: Gordon Thomas
 Gordon Thomas website

1933 births
2017 deaths
Welsh writers
Welsh novelists
People educated at Bedford Modern School